Johnny Gill is the third album by Johnny Gill, released in 1990, and his first for Motown Records.  The album produced four hit singles: "Rub You the Right Way," "My, My, My," "Wrap My Body Tight" and "Fairweather Friend".  The album was recorded with the label during the hiatus of New Edition.  
The album sold over 4 million copies worldwide. Before joining New Edition for their Heart Break album in 1988, he had already recorded two singles for the album - of which "Just a Lonely Night" and "Feel So Much Better". By February 1991, the album had already sold approximately 2,050,000 copies in the United States and 50,000 in Canada, making the album 2x platinum in the United States at the time.

Track listing

Notes
 (co.) - signifies as co-producer

Personnel
Johnny Gill - percussion, backing vocals, lead vocals
Jimmy Jam - percussion, drum and keyboard programming, arranger
Terry Lewis - percussion, backing vocals, arranger
Babyface - keyboards
Cirocco - keyboards, synthesizers, Fender Rhodes, sound effects
Jim Demgen - keyboards
Randy Ran - keyboards, drum and keyboard programming, backing vocals, arranger
Steve Kroon - percussion
O'Jania, Daryl Simmons, Tony Tolbert, The Waters Sisters, Lance Ellington, After 7, Linda Brown, Pebbles, Karyn White - backing vocals
Georg Wadenius - guitar
Kayo, Lucio Hopper - bass
Buddy Williams - drums, percussion
L.A. Reid - drums, percussion, mixing
Kenny G - saxophone

Production
Peter McCabe - Mixing
Steve Meltzer - Artwork
Louis Padgett - Engineer
Donnell Sullivan - Assistant Engineer, Mixing Assistant
John VanNest - Mixing
Chris Cuffaro - Photography
Beth Yenni - Design
Zetra Smith - Production Coordination
John Payne - Assistant Engineer
Michael Alvord - Assistant Engineer
Jheryl Busby - Executive Producer
Jim Dutt - Engineer
Brian Gardner - Mastering
Jon Gass - Engineer, Mixing
Steve Hodge - Engineer, Mixing

Charts

See also
List of number-one R&B albums of 1990 (U.S.)

References

1990 albums
Johnny Gill albums
Motown albums
Albums produced by Jimmy Jam and Terry Lewis
Albums produced by L.A. Reid
Albums produced by Babyface (musician)